I Can Get It for You Wholesale is a 1951 American romantic drama film directed by Michael Gordon. The screenplay by Abraham Polonsky is based on Vera Caspary's loose adaptation of the 1937 novel of the same title by Jerome Weidman.

Plot
Set in New York City's garment district, the story focuses on ambitious model and fashion designer Harriet Boyd, production manager Sam Cooper, and salesman Teddy Sherman, who leave their firm to start their own business that specializes in $10.95 dresses. Their plans temporarily are derailed when Harriet's mother refuses to give her the insurance payment the family received when her father died, having promised it to Harriet's younger sister Marge for her wedding. Harriet dupes Marge and her fiancé Ray into giving her the money, and Sherboyco Dresses opens for business.

Teddy, who has fallen in love with Harriet, is dismayed when she flirts with lecherous buyer Mr. Savage during a business dinner, so he proposes marriage. She declines his offer, telling him she enjoys her freedom. Her refusal prompts Teddy to try to back out of their partnership, but he discovers their contract is ironclad.

Harriet begins dating J. F. Noble, the owner of a chain of upscale department stores, who wants her to quit and work exclusively for him. Her uncertainty puts her on edge, and when Teddy discusses her change in attitude, she claims she is stressed by overwork and wants to quit. Teddy repeats his offer of marriage and this time Harriet considers accepting. She visits Noble to decline his offer, but Teddy interrupts their meeting, misunderstands her motives, and mistakenly believes her behavior was a ploy designed to lead the way to her departure from Sherboyco. Heartbroken and angry, Teddy departs, and soon after leaves town for a sales trip. During his absence, Harriet shifts money from Sherboyco to a new company she is founding, stops production on Sherboyco's dresses, and begins designing for Noble's department stores.

Unaware what has happened, Teddy continues to take orders for Sherboyco's popular low-cost women's wear while on the road. Not until buyer Hermione Griggs contacts him about an order she has not received does he learn about Harriet's deception. She tries to convince her Sherboyco partners it is in their best interest to align with her at Noble's company, but Sam and Teddy prefer to declare bankruptcy rather than join forces with the competition. Harriet prepares to sail to Paris with Noble, but at the last moment she realizes her commitment to Sam and Teddy is too important to ignore. She returns to Sherboyco, where she admits she loves Teddy and asks him and Sam to forgive her.

Production
The protagonist of Weidman's novel had been an ambitious businessman, but his gender was changed to accommodate Twentieth Century Fox contract player Susan Hayward. She and co-star Dan Dailey reprised their film roles for a Lux Radio Theatre broadcast on March 31, 1952.

Shortly after the film was released, screenwriter Abraham Polonsky was called to testify before the House Un-American Activities Committee. Although he refused to deny or confirm affiliation with the Communist Party, he found himself blacklisted. He continued to write under pseudonyms, but it was not until Madigan in 1968 that he received screen credit under his own name.
 
The film was released in the United Kingdom as This Is My Affair. When it was broadcast on American television in 1962, its title was changed to Only the Best to avoid confusion with the stage musical based on Weidman's novel that was running on Broadway at the time.

Main cast
Susan Hayward as Harriet Boyd  
 Dan Dailey as Teddy Sherman  
 George Sanders as J.F. Noble  
 Sam Jaffe as Sam Cooper  
 Randy Stuart as Marge Boyd  
 Marvin Kaplan as Arnold Fisher  
 Harry von Zell as Savage 
 Barbara Whiting as Ellen Cooper  
 Vicki Cummings as Hermione Griggs  
 Ross Elliott as Ray  
 Richard Lane as Kelley  
 Mary Philips as Mrs. Boyd

Critical reception
Bosley Crowther of the New York Times observed, "In adapting Jerome Weidman's sizzling novel of 1937 to the screen, Vera Caspary has changed practically everything except the title of Mr. Weidman's book. An ambitious model now is the center of attraction, but she does not compare with Harry Bogen, the breezy, unscrupulous Bronxite who left a trail of broken promises in his sweep up Seventh Avenue in the novel. However, give Susan Hayward some quick recognition for bringing to life a hard-shelled dame, who travels just as fast and loose as the screenplay written by Abraham Polonsky permits her to. Within the story framework laid out by Miss Caspary, Mr. Polonsky has written some crisp, double-edged dialogue, but the flavor of the garment industry never is really exploited. This is regrettable because the chief distinction in the way of freshness the picture has to offer are the scenes which reflect the pulse beat of the dress industry — the crowds scurrying along Seventh Avenue amid the traffic of dress carts and the frenetic atmosphere of the showrooms where the buyers are not only baited with dresses but blandishments as well. The camera roves excitingly through this fabulous, hurly-burly in the pictures' opening sequences, but too soon Director Michael Gordon has to face the business of telling the story of a pert young-lady who is determined to climb to the top of the heap . . . With less whitewash and more honesty, I Can Get It for You Wholesale could have been an exciting, instead of just an average good, entertainment."

TV Guide rated it three out of four stars, calling it a "smooth but not stellar adaptation of Weidman's novel" and "about as accurate an image as one can get of the 'Rag Trade' circa 1951."

References

External links 
 

1951 films
Films based on American novels
Films set in New York City
Films shot in New York City
Films directed by Michael Gordon
20th Century Fox films
1951 romantic drama films
American romantic drama films
Films produced by Sol C. Siegel
Films scored by Sol Kaplan
Films about fashion designers
American black-and-white films
1950s English-language films
1950s American films